The Toyota Prius Plug-in Hybrid (often abbreviated as the Prius  and known as the Prius Prime in North America, South Korea, and New Zealand) is a plug-in hybrid liftback manufactured by Toyota. The first-generation model was produced from 2012 to 2016. The second-generation model has been produced since 2016. Production of the third-generation model is expected to commence in 2023.

The Prius Plug-in Hybrid was the second most sold plug-in electric car in 2012, and became third-best all-time in December 2014. As sales declined after the end of its production, the Prius PHV fell to fifth place in the global ranking by November 2015, after being surpassed by both the Tesla Model S and the Mitsubishi Outlander PHEV. , sales were led by North America with 66,800 units, followed by Japan with 48,800, and the European market with 13,100 units. The U.S. was the leading country market with 65,703 units sold by 2017. , cumulative global sales of both Prius plug-in generations totaled 209,000 units.

Concept and demonstration models

The Prius Plug-In Hybrid Concept was exhibited at the September 2009 Frankfurt Motor Show, the October 2009 Tokyo Motor Show, and the December 2009 Los Angeles Auto Show. The vehicle was based on the third-generation Toyota Prius (model XW30) but outfitted with 5.2 kWh lithium-ion batteries.

After displaying the concept version in these three shows, a global demonstration program involving 600 pre-production test cars began in late 2009 and took place in Australia, Canada, China, France, Germany, Japan, New Zealand and the United States. The demonstration vehicles were made available for lease to fleet and government customers, of which, 230 were delivered in Japan beginning in late December 2009, 125 in the U.S. by early 2010, and 200 in Europe in spring 2010. All program vehicles were equipped with data tracking devices to allow Toyota to monitor the car's usage for further development of the plug-in hybrid system.

The pre-production Prius Plug-in used three different batteries: two added batteries to provide all-electric drive and the standard hybrid battery which engages when the first two are depleted, allowing the car to operate like a regular hybrid Prius. According to Toyota, when the vehicle started, it operates in all-electric mode, drawing electrical power directly from the first battery pack. When the first battery was depleted, it disconnected from the circuit and the second pack engaged. When the second pack was depleted, it disconnected from the circuit and the vehicle defaulted to conventional hybrid mode, using the main battery as the sole electrical power source. Pack one and pack two would not reengage with the circuit until the vehicle was plugged in and charged.

Demonstration programs by country
Australia

The program in Australia included five demonstrator plug-ins allocated to government agencies.

Canada
In March 2010 Toyota launched its demonstration program in Canada with five demonstrator plug-ins in partnership with academic institutions, hydro-electric producers, and governmental agencies in each of the four provinces participating in the program: British Columbia, Manitoba, Ontario and Québec. Canada is home to Toyota's global cold weather research center in Northern Ontario, and the country's cold weather will serve to evaluate its adverse effect on battery performance and range.

In July 2010 the first demonstrator plug-in was delivered in Manitoba. The unit was shared and tested by partners Manitoba Hydro, Manitoba Innovation, Energy and Mines, and the University of Manitoba. There were a total of 15 partners in the four provinces that participated in the Canadian demonstration trial.

China
On 28 October 2010, Toyota signed an agreement with China Automotive Technology and Research Center on jointly carrying out field trials of the demonstrator plug-ins in China.

France

The demonstration program in Strasbourg was launched in April 2010. The 3-year program involved 70 demonstrator plug-ins and the deployment of dedicated charging infrastructure. The program set up more than 150 charging points at private parking lots of firms participating in the program, user homes, public parking lots and on public roads. The program was run by Électricité de France in partnership with Toyota and the City and the Urban Community of Strasbourg, and is financially supported through a research fund managed by the French Environment and Energy Management Agency.

The City and the Urban Community of Strasbourg will leased five demonstrator plug-ins and also provided a subsidy to a local carsharing company to lease three demonstrators. The remaining vehicles will be leased to other public institutions and private companies.

Germany
The demonstration program in Germany was conducted in Baden-Württemberg with ten demonstrator plug-ins and the corresponding dedicated charging infrastructure. The program was run by German energy provider EnBW.

Japan

In Japan, Toyota leased approximately 230 demonstrator plug-ins to government ministries, local governments selected for the Japanese Ministry of Economy, Trade and Industry's EV & PHV Towns program, corporations such, as electric power companies, and other entities. As part of the demonstration program and beginning in July 2010, two demonstrator plug-ins were made available for short-term rental in the city of Gotō, Nagasaki.

United Kingdom
The demonstration trial in the UK began in late June 2010 with a fleet of 20 demonstrator plug-ins. Toyota partnered with Électricité de France to carry out a three-year trial, and as part of the program a number of charging bays will be deployed in London. The trial Prius Plug-in Hybrids will be available through leasing to public sector organizations and business users. Among the organizations that received the first Prius Plug-ins are Transport for London, the Government Car and Despatch Agency, the Metropolitan Police Service, News International and Sky.

United States

A total of 125 demonstrator plug-ins were deployed in the US. In October 2009, Toyota announced its first regional program partnership in the U.S. with Xcel Energy's SmartGridCity program in Boulder, Colorado. The research project was coordinated by the University of Colorado at Boulder Renewable and Sustainable Energy Institute (RASEI). Boulder offered the opportunity of monitoring the performance of Toyota's first-generation lithium-ion battery at high altitude and under cold climate. Other partnerships were made with Qualcomm and the South Coast Air Quality Management District. Other regional programs considered were Northern and Southern California, Washington, D.C., New York City, Portland and Pittsburgh, which offered different conditions for vehicle performance and customer needs.

In June 2010 the demonstration vehicles were delivered to Portland State University, the Silicon Valley Leadership Group, San Diego Gas & Electric and the California Center for Sustainable Energy. In the following weeks, an additional 30 vehicles were assigned to Silicon Valley groups and companies, including the University of California, Berkeley. In August 2010 two demonstrators were delivered to be tested in San Francisco's municipal fleet as part of the demonstration program.

Georgetown University was the first partner in Washington, D.C. to participate in the program under the sponsorship of the U.S. Department of Energy's Clean Cities program. Two demonstrators were loaned in December 2010 and sixteen Georgetown employees tested the vehicles in three-month rotations. Five demonstrators were delivered to New York City, two were tested by the New York City Department of Transportation and three by the Port Authority of New York and New Jersey.

As part of the demonstration program, Toyota delivered eight Prius plug-in hybrids to Zipcar in January 2011. The car sharing firm selected three markets to make the plug-in hybrids available to its members, three cars in Boston and Cambridge, Massachusetts, three in San Francisco, California, and two in Portland, Oregon.

Field test results
Europe
Toyota reported the following findings for the European demonstration fleet after about a year of testing, representing the driving experience acquired by the participants after  driven:
The demonstrator vehicles consumed 36% less fuel than the comparable, best-in-class diesel vehicle, and almost 50% less than the best-in-class gasoline vehicle.

United Kingdom
Based on the results from less than one year of real-world use for the 20 demonstrators leased to EDF Energy, Toyota reported the following findings:
Driving in electric-only (EV) mode accounted for one-third of the distance driven in the demonstration.
Twenty-two percent of drivers were able to drive further than the official  range in EV mode.
Fuel consumption data indicates performance is 27% better than an equivalent diesel-powered vehicle.

United States
Consumer Reports tested a demonstrator for two weeks and reported an all-electric range between  upfront at the beginning of each trip. On a  trip, the vehicle averaged , while on commute trips between  the vehicle averaged  with an EV ratio of 40 to 56 percent.

First generation (XW30; 2012) 

The car was based on a third-generation Toyota Prius (model XW30) outfitted with a 4.4 kWh lithium-ion battery co-developed with Panasonic. Deliveries of the production model began in Japan in January 2012, in late February in the United States, and by late June 2012 in Europe. A total of about 75,400 first-generation units were sold worldwide through April 2016.

After the conclusion of the demonstration program, the production version of the Prius Plug-in Hybrid was unveiled at the September 2011 Frankfurt Motor Show. Toyota ultimately only did a small production run of this first-generation Prius Plug-in Hybrid between January 2012 and October 2016. A cumulative total of 75,400 vehicles were sold worldwide between December 2012 and April 2016. The United States led sales with 42,345 first-generation units delivered through September 2016, when dealerships run out of stock. Japan ranked second with 22,100 units, followed by Europe with 10,600 units, both through January 2017.

In blended mode, the plug-in has a fuel economy rating of 95 miles per gallon gasoline equivalent (mpg-e) (36 kW⋅h/100 mi; 22 kW⋅h/100 km).

Drivetrain 

The production version of the Prius Plug-in has two key modifications from the demonstration units based on the data and customer feedback gathered. The production version has a selectable electric driving mode (EV mode), allowing drivers to conserve energy for use in those places where EV mode is more efficient, such as city driving. Additionally, production vehicles utilize a single battery, allowing more regenerative braking energy to be captured, extending range in EV mode.

The Prius Plug-in Hybrid uses the Hybrid Synergy Drive of the standard third-generation Prius (XW30), but with a 4.4 kWh lithium-ion battery that significantly expands the all-electric range as compared to the regular Prius, and fully rechargeable from a domestic source.

Like the Hybrid Synergy Drive of the standard third-generation Prius, the plug-in has two high-output electric motors, one  unit (motor–generator 2, MG2) that mainly works to power the transaxle, and another smaller unit (motor–generator 1, MG1) rated at  that creates energy during regenerative braking and acts as a starter for the gasoline engine. Maximum motor-drive voltage is 650 volts DC. 

After the electric driving range is exhausted, the plug-in switches into hybrid operation at a pre-determined state of battery charge (SOC) and operates as a conventional full hybrid with a similar efficiency of a standard Prius. 

The Prius Plug-in has three drive modes, all-electric (EV), and two hybrid modes: Eco and Power. The EV mode is user-selectable and when running in this mode the hybrid engine control unit (ECU) operates the vehicle using only the larger motor–generator (MG2) if pre-determined parameters are satisfied, such as sufficient battery state of charge (SOC) and vehicle speed within EV mode range. The Eco mode is designed to maximize fuel savings for any driving conditions and modifies or smoothes out the electronic throttle control program to reduce throttle response, reducing the throttle opening to a maximum of 11.6%, and also modifies the operation of the air conditioning system. As an additional benefit, the Eco mode improves performance in low-traction conditions because the reduced output helps to minimize wheel skidding such as those caused by ice and snow. Power mode increases throttle response in the middle range more than normal.

Battery and range 
The production version was unveiled at the September 2011 Frankfurt Motor Show with a lithium-ion battery pack that stores 4.4 kWh. The lithium-ion battery pack can be charged in 180 minutes at 120 volts or in 90 minutes at 240 volts.

The United States Environmental Protection Agency (EPA) issued two estimated EV range ratings to the Prius Plug-in. A driving range for blended operation electric-gasoline of  until the battery is depleted. EPA estimated a total range of  until both sources of power are depleted.

The 4.4 kWh lithium-ion battery developed for the Prius Plug-in fits under the rear cargo floor and weighs . As a comparison, the nickel-metal hydride battery of the third-generation Prius, which has a capacity of only 1.3 kWh, weighs . A full charge using an external AC outlet takes approximately 2.5 to 3 hours from a standard North American 120 V 15 A household outlet, or 1.5 hours using a standard European 230 V household outlet. The battery requires approximately 3.2 kWh of electricity plus  of gasoline to provide  of range. The included charging cable connects to the charging port inlet located on the right-rear fender. The charge port location was moved from the front driver-side fender in the demonstration model based on input from the program participants. The charge port provides LED (Light Emitting Diode) illumination for convenient night-time charging. A timer allows charging to take place during off-peak hours and can be set for either a start or end time.

Fuel economy 

The Prius PHEV overall EV mode/hybrid fuel economy is higher than the Honda Accord Plug-in Hybrid and both Ford Energi models, but lower than the BMW i3 REx, Chevrolet Volt and the Cadillac ELR.

Based on the JC08 Japanese test cycle, the Prius PHV fuel efficiency is 61.0 km/L (143 mpg-US, 1.64 L/100 km), calculated from combined all-electric (EV) and hybrid (HV) driving modes, with only 38 g/km of  emissions. The electric power consumption rate is 8.74 km/kWh. After the battery has been depleted, the HV mode fuel efficiency is 31.6 km/L (74.3 mpg-US, 3.16 L/100 km).

The EPA's 2014 edition of the "Light-Duty Automotive Technology, Carbon Dioxide Emissions, and Fuel Economy Trends" introduced utility factors for plug-in hybrids to represent the percentage of miles that will be driven using electricity by an average driver, in electric only or blended modes. The Prius PHV has a factor of 29%, compared with 83% for the BMW i3 REx, 66% for the Chevrolet Volt, 45% for the Ford Energi models, and 33% for the Honda Accord Plug-in Hybrid.

Tailpipe emissions 
The EPA also accounted for the upstream  emissions associated with the production and distribution of electricity required to charge the vehicle. Since electricity production in the United States varies significantly from region to region, the EPA considered three scenarios/ranges with the low end of the range corresponding to the California powerplant emissions factor, the middle of the range represented by the national average powerplant emissions factor, and the upper end of the range corresponding to the powerplant emissions factor for the Rockies. The following table shows the Prius PHEV tailpipe emission plus total upstream  emissions for the three scenarios, compared with other six popular plug-in hybrids and the average gasoline-powered car:

Safety 
In the United States, the Prius Plug-in includes Toyota's Vehicle Proximity Notification System (VPNS), which is designed to alert pedestrians, the blind, and others of the vehicle's presence due to significant noise reduction typical of a hybrid vehicle traveling at low speeds in EV mode. This type of warning device is mandated by the Pedestrian Safety Enhancement Act of 2010. The pitch varies with the vehicle's speed to give pedestrians a sense of whether the approaching Prius is accelerating or decelerating.

Fire incident

During the storm and subsequent flooding caused by Hurricane Sandy in October 2012, one Prius Plug-in and 16 Fisker Karmas caught fire while being parked at Port Newark-Elizabeth Marine Terminal. The vehicles were partially submerged by flash floods caused by the hurricane. In the Toyota lot, one Prius Plug-in burned, and two other Priuses, a conventional hybrid and a plug-in, just smoldered. A Toyota spokeswoman said the fire, "likely started because saltwater got into the electrical system." She also clarified that the incident affected only three out of the more than 2,128 plug-in or hybrid models at the terminal during the storm.

Other features 
Among the design features exclusive to the plug-in are: unique chrome grille and bumper trim, chrome door handles, unique 15-inch alloy wheels, blue-accented headlamps, a distinct tail lamp design, and a new Hybrid Synergy Drive Plug-in badge.

In the United States the Prius Plug-in Hybrid is available in two models, the standard Prius Plug-in and the Prius Plug-in Advanced, and offered in five exterior colors. The standard trim level includes all the features of the 2012 Prius Two Liftback grade, plus some features from the Prius Three and Prius Four grades. Standard features include heated front seats, remote air conditioning system (which can run either off the grid while the vehicle is plugged in or off the battery like the third-generation Prius), a charger timer, EV/ECO/POWER modes, three-door smart key with push-button start, new touch-screen display audio with navigation and an integrated backup camera, Toyota Entune, and LED daytime running lights. Additional features of the Prius Plug-in Advanced include head-up display, LED headlamps, softex interior seat trim, eight-way adjustable power driver seat, JBL premium audio and HDD navigation system and exclusive Entune Plug-in Hybrid Applications for smartphones. Additional safety features in the Advanced model include the Pre-Collision System with Dynamic Radar Cruise Control and Safety Connect system.

Second generation (XW50; 2016) 

The second-generation Prius plug-in is called the Prius Prime in the United States, Canada, South Korea and New Zealand and Prius PHV in Japan and Europe. It was first available in 2016 and is currently being produced. It is based on the fourth-generation Toyota Prius (model XW50) outfitted with a drive system powered by an 8.8 kWh lithium-ion battery. Retail deliveries of the Prime began in the United States in November 2016, and it was released in the Japanese market in February 2017.

In August 2013, just months after that the first-generation Prius Plug-in Hybrid went on sale, Toyota announced that the company was already working to develop the fourth-generation Prius (XW50). They also announced that unlike the prior generation, where the plug-in battery was added to the existing Prius, the second-generation plug-in would be developed in parallel with the standard Prius model. One of the major issues Toyota wanted to correct with the new-generation plug-in was to add additional all-electric range.

Both the fourth-generation standard Prius and the second-generation plug-in would benefit from advances in battery, electric motor and gasoline engine technologies that would enable significantly improved fuel economy and driving performance, in a more compact package that is lighter in weight and lower in cost. The next Prius models would use improved batteries with higher energy density, smaller electric motors with higher power density, and the gasoline engine would feature thermal efficiency greater than 40% (the third-generation Prius was 38.5%).

The second-generation Prius plug-in hybrid, known as the Toyota Prius Prime in the US, Canada, South Korea and New Zealand, was unveiled at the March 2016 New York International Auto Show. Retail deliveries of the Prius Prime began in the US in November 2016, and, unlike the first-generation model, it was available in all 50 states. Toyota sales target for the US is about 20,000 Prius Prime models annually. The second-generation Prius PHV was released in the Japanese market in February 2017, with a sales target of more than 30,000 units per year.

The final mpg-e is a 40% improvement over the first-generation model, and higher than the 120 mpg-e that Toyota was targeting. Toyota was also able to make the fuel economy in hybrid mode equal to the regular fourth-generation Prius liftback. Unlike its predecessor, the Prime runs entirely on electricity while in EV mode.

The 2017 through 2019 model years had a four-seat cabin layout with a center console between the rear seats. During the mid-generation refresh for the 2020 model year, Toyota replaced the center console with a seat, allowing 5 passengers to sit in the vehicle.

Specifications

Drivetrain 
Like the related fourth-generation Toyota Prius, the plug-in version of the Prius is powered by Toyota's Hybrid Synergy Drive (HSD) powertrain with a 1.8 L 2ZR-FXE straight-4, atkinson cycle gasoline engine with port-injection coupled with a dual motor generator drive system linked to a lithium-ion battery pack. The Prius Prime has a 8.8 kWh battery pack that is much larger than the 0.75 kWh pack used in the regular Prius. Unlike the traditional Prius, the plug-in version is capable of using both motor–generators as traction motors while in all-electric mode.

Battery and range 

The all-electric range is more than double that of the first-generation Prius Plug-in Hybrid, but lags behind the Hyundai Ioniq Plug-in, Hyundai Sonata PHEV and the Chevrolet Volt.

The  forced-air-cooled battery pack made by Panasonic is located under the back seat and the rear cargo floor. To keep up with the demands of charging the larger pack, the onboard charger was upgraded to 3.3 kW, up from 2.2 kW in the Prius Plug-in. The lithium-ion battery pack can be charged in 5.5 hours at 120 volts, or 2.2 hours at 240 volts.

Fuel economy 

Compared to all-electric cars, only the Hyundai Ioniq Electric and Tesla Model 3 Standard Range have a higher energy efficiency.

Toyota was also able to make the fuel economy in hybrid mode nearly equal to the regular fourth-generation Prius liftback, despite the extra weight of the much larger battery pack. Only the Prius Eco has a higher EPA-rated fuel economy rating in hybrid mode. 

The high fuel economy is enabled by several weight-saving design changes compared to the regular Prius: the hood is made from aluminum and the rear hatch is made from carbon-fiber-reinforced polymer. Additionally, the rear hatch uses a "dual-wave" curved glass design to help cut drag.

GR Sport trim level 

The GR Sport Package includes suspension tuning, additional bracing, a digital tachometer, a different shift knob, aluminium pedals, and a small diameter steering wheel. On the exterior, the Prius PHV GR Sport received a custom front bumper with much larger LED accents and a black grille and a custom rear bumper with extra lights and an F1-style brake light. Additionally, the Prius PHV GR Sport gained side skirts and bigger wheels. The Prius PHV GR Sport retains the plug-in hybrid powertrain of the stock Prius PHV, with no modifications.

Mid-generation refresh 
In 2019, Toyota released a mid-generation refresh for the 2020 model year. The trim levels were renamed from Plus, Premium, and Advanced, to LE, XLE, and Limited, respectively, which puts the trim level structure in line with the rest of Toyota's lineup. Across all trims, Sirius XM satellite radio and Apple CarPlay were added as standard features. In the front of the car, the sun visors added extenders and the placement of the seat heater switches was made more prominent for better usability. The gloss white plastic found in the center console and steering wheel was replaced with gloss black for all trim levels. In the rear cabin, the middle console was replaced by a seat, allowing 5 passengers to sit in the vehicle, and two USB charging ports were added.

Third generation (XW60; 2023) 

The third-generation Prius Plug-in Hybrid was unveiled on 16 November 2022 for the 2022 Los Angeles Auto Show. Because of this performance increase, in the North American market, Toyota will market the Prius Prime with its sport-oriented trim levels: SE, XSE, and XSE Premium. Unlike the second generation, but similar to the first generation, there is little external visual differentiation between the traditional Prius and the plug-in version.

Now under the back seats, the 13.6 kWh lithium-ion battery pack has a more than 50% greater capacity compared to the previous generation, enabling a manufacturer estimated  of electric driving range.

The vehicle is equipped Toyota's updated audio multimedia system that debuted on the XK70 series Tundra and the Toyota Safety Sense (TSS) 3.0 suite of advanced driver-assistance systems. It is the first model to offer the TSS 3.0 system's Traffic Jam Assist function that allows the driver to go hands-free, with the on-board computers handling acceleration, braking, and steering under . The third-generation Prius Plug-in Hybrid will also offer optional solar panels under its glass roof that charge the battery while the vehicle is parked and provide supplemental power for accessory functions like air conditioning while it is being driven.

Markets

Japan 

North America 
The North American market Prius Prime is available in three grade levels: SE, XSE, and XSE Premium. All grades are powered with the M20A-FXS engine; unlike the regular Prius, the Prius Prime only comes with FWD as standard on all trims.

Europe 
For the European market, the Prius Plug-in will be the only version available.

Markets and sales

Toyota's initial global sales goal was to sell more than 60,000 Prius PHV a year, with Japan as the main market and aiming for 40,000 units, two-thirds of the carmaker's global sales goal. During its first year in the market, a total of 27,279 Prius PHVs were sold worldwide, allowing the Prius PHV to rank as the second most sold plug-in electric car for 2012. Sales in 2012 were led by the United States with 12,750 units delivered, followed by Japan with 10,970 units. In 2012, the Prius PHV was the best selling plug-in electric car in Sweden (499 units) and the top selling plug-in hybrid in the UK (470 units), France (413 units), and Norway (171 units). The top selling European market was the Netherlands, with 1,184 units sold during 2012.

Accounting for cumulative sales since its inception, the Prius PHV ranked as the world's third best selling PEV by December 2014. By May 2015, the Prius plug-in fell to fourth place after the Tesla Model S. and by November 2015 it was also surpassed in the global ranking by the Mitsubishi Outlander P-HEV, as the Prius sales declined after the end of its production in June 2015.

, global first-generation Prius PHVs sales totaled 75,400 units since 2012, with the North American market accounting for 56.6% of all sales. The United States led sales with 42,345 units delivered through September 2016, when dealerships run out of stock. By the end of 2016, the Prius plug-in ranked as the world's all-time third top selling plug-in hybrid after the Volt/Ampera family of vehicles, and the Mitsubishi Outlander P-HEV.

The second-generation Prius Prime was released to retail customers in the U.S. in November 2016, and in Japan in February 2017. Toyota expected to sell up to 60,000 units globally a year, with Japan accounting for more than half of those sales. Global cumulative sales of both Prius plug-in generations totaled 128,900 units at the end of 2017. Sales were led by North America with 66,800 units delivered, followed by Japan with 48,800 units sold, and the European market with cumulative sales of 13,100 units. About 200 units were sold in the rest of the world. The European market is led by the Netherlands with 4,134 units registered by the end of November 2015, followed by the UK with 1,580 units registered at the end of December 2015, and Sweden with 1,227 registrations up until April 2016. The U.S. continued as the top selling country market with 65,703 units delivered by the end of 2017. , cumulative sales of both Prius PHV generations totaled 209,000 units worldwide.

Canada

During its first month in the market sold 21 units. The Prius Plug-in is eligible in several provinces for purchase rebates. According to its battery size, the Prius PHV was eligible in British Columbia for a  rebate starting on 1 December 2011. In Quebec the plug-in was eligible for a  rebate beginning on 1 January 2012, and a  rebate in Ontario under its Electric Vehicle Incentive Program. A total of 63 units were sold during 2012, and 212 in 2013. Cumulative sales totaled 1,102 units through December 2017.

In May 2017, Toyota Canada announced availability of the second-generation Prius Prime for the Canadian market. Initially available in both a standard and a Technology package, the model was exclusively available in Quebec (qualifying for a  provincial rebate) in recognition of a 60 percent increase in plug-in vehicle sales in the province during 2016. After selling more than 700 Prius Primes in Quebec, in January 2018 Toyota Canada announced a nationwide release for the Prius Prime and an additional Upgrade trim between the standard and Technology levels. It is eligible for a  rebate from the British Columbia government; a  rebate from the Ontario government was available until the cancellation of the province's cap-and-trade program in July 2018.

France

Deliveries of the Prius Plug-in Hybrid began in France in September 2012. The Prius PHV was the top selling plug-in hybrid in France for 2012 with 413 units registered, more than doubling Ampera sales (190). Sales were down to 393 units in 2013, and fell to 38 units in 2014. , registrations totaled 912 units since 2012.

Retail deliveries of the second-generation Prius PHV are scheduled to begin in June 2017. Due to its  emissions (22 g/km), the Prius PHV is not eligible to the government's  (~ ) ecological bonus.

Japan

Toyota began taking orders on late November 2011 and the Prius PHV was released on 30 January 2012. Toyota's sales target for the Japanese market was set between 35,000 and 40,000 units per year. A total of 15,400 units had been sold between 2012 and December 2013. An additional 5,187 units were sold in 2014. Cumulative sales totaled about 22,100 first-generation models through January 2017.

In October 2013 Toyota announced upgrades and reduced pricing for the 2014 Prius PHV in the Japanese market. The model will be offered in a new two-tone paint scheme, newly designed aluminium alloy wheels, LED illumination for the "PHV" and "Hybrid Synergy Drive" badges. Interior changes include a padded compartment box in the center of the dashboard for keeping the smartphone, and some dark wood grain inserts in the center console and the armrests. In addition, Toyota explained that the 2014 Prius Plug-In Hybrid will be manufactured using an improved spot-welding process that results in increased structural rigidity, which will reduce noise and vibration, and improve ride quality and steering feel. The Japanese-market 2014 Prius PHV will be offered in four trim levels: L, S, G and G Leather Package.

The second-generation Prius PHV was released in Japan on 15 February 2017. Toyota expected to sell more than 30,000 units a year in Japan. Sales in 2017 totaled about 26,700 units. , cumulative sales of both Prius plug-in generations totaled 48,800 units sold.

Netherlands
Deliveries began in August 2012. The price includes installation of a charging station at home, and owners also benefit from several tax exemptions and enjoy free parking due to car's low emissions.

A total of 1,184 units were sold during 2012, making the Prius PHV the second best selling plug-in electric vehicle in the country after the Opel Ampera (2,693 units), and also making the Netherlands the top selling European market for the Prius PHV during 2012. Sales totaled 2,707 units during 2013, ranking third in the Dutch plug-in electric car segment after the Mitsubishi Outlander P-HEV (8,038) and the Volvo V60 Plug-in Hybrid (6,238). Prius PHV registrations totaled 4,134 units at the end of November 2015.

Sweden

The Prius PHEV was the top selling plug-in electric car in the country during 2012, with 499 units sold. An additional 376 units were sold in 2013, and ranked as the second most sold PEV that year. A total of 1,085 Prius PHEVs had been registered in Sweden through December 2014, ranking as the third top selling plug-in electric vehicle in the country after the Mitsubishi Outlander P-HEV (2,385) and the Volvo V60 Plug-in Hybrid (1,388). A total of 132 units were registered in 2015, and cumulative registrations totaled 1,217 units through December 2015.

United Kingdom

After the subsidy is applied, the Prius Plug-in ends up on par with the Nissan Leaf electric car. Deliveries to fleet customers began in August 2012. , a total of 470 units were sold since its introduction to the market in July 2012, allowing the Prius PHV to surpass the Vauxhall Ampera and ranking as the top selling plug-in hybrid in the country. In 2013 the Prius PHV ranked again as the top selling plug-in hybrid with 509 units sold, up 8.5% from 2012. Cumulative sales through December 2013 reached 979 units. , the Prius plug-in ranked second after the Nissan Leaf, then the British market leader, but by December 2014 it fell to fifth place among plug-in electric cars, and second place among plug-in hybrids after the Mitsubishi Outlander P-HEV. A total of 1,580 Prius PHVs were registered in the UK by the end of December 2015.

Retail deliveries of the second-generation Prius PHV are scheduled to begin in March 2017.

United States

The production Prius Plug-in Hybrid was introduced in the U.S. on 16 September 2011, at the Green Drive Expo in Richmond, California. All trims had a  delivery fee. There were no changes in the vehicle content as compared to the 2013 model, and the price reduction took effect in November 2013, when deliveries of the new model year began. All trims have a mandatory  delivery fee.

The Prius Plug-in also qualified for California's Enhanced Advanced Technology-Partial Zero-Emissions Vehicle (EAT-PZEV) status, which allowed plug-in owners to have free access to use carpool lanes even when traveling solo. The Prius Prime is eligible for federal tax credit of  due to its larger 8.8 kWh battery. Also meets eligibility for additional incentives at the state and local level. The Prime also qualifies for California's clean air green sticker for free access to high-occupancy vehicle lanes.

On 22 April 2011 Toyota introduced its priority registration website for customers interested in ordering the Prius Plug-in Hybrid, even though the purchase price had not been announced at that time. Registration guaranteed first access to Toyota's Online Order System, which began sales in October 2011, but limited to the 14 launch states. Toyota reported that during its first month since the process began, more than 17,000 potential buyers signed up through its reservation website, by mid July 2011, 29,000 potential buyers had registered, and deposits were taken by dealers beginning in November 2011. The plug-in hybrid is available in two trims and five colors.

Production began in January 2012, and retail deliveries began in late February 2012. Initial availability was limited, and, the Prius PHV was offered only in 15 states: Arizona, California, Connecticut, Hawaii, Maine, Maryland, Massachusetts, New Hampshire, New Jersey, New York, Oregon, Rhode Island, Vermont, Virginia and Washington. According to Toyota these are the states where nearly 60% of all Prius models are currently sold in the country. The Prius Plug-in was originally advertised to become available in all remaining states in 2013; however, nationwide availability never materialized and the car was only sold in the original 15 states until its discontinuation in 2015. Toyota announced it expects to sell in the U.S. market around 15,000 units a year initially. Toyota delivered seven plug-ins in February, sold 891 units in March 2012, its first full month on the market, and in April 2012 the Prius PHV was the top selling plug-in electric car for that month.

, cumulative sales of first-generation Prius PHV totaled 42,345 units since 2012, ranking as the second top selling plug-in hybrid car in the U.S. after the Chevrolet Volt. Only 52 units were sold during the first three-quarters of 2016, as Toyota dealerships run out of stock in October due to the earlier end of production. Retail deliveries of the second-generation Prius Prime began in November 2016. A total of 781 units were sold during its first month in the American market, setting a new record monthly sales volume debut for any plug-in electric car released in the U.S. Combined sales of both Prius plug-in generations totaled with 65,703 units sold since inception through December 2017.

Recognition
The Toyota Prius Plug-in was a finalist for the 2010 Green Car Vision Award. The Prius Plug-in won the 2012 Urban Green Vehicle of the Year Award. Shared with the Toyota Prius v, the Prius plug-in was awarded Green Car Report's Best Car to Buy 2012.

See also 
 Government incentives for plug-in electric vehicles
 List of modern production plug-in electric vehicles
 Plug-in electric vehicle

References

External links 

  (US)

Toyota Prius
Plug-in hybrid vehicles
Cars introduced in 2012
Prius Plug-in Hybrid
Compact cars
Hatchbacks